KNDY-FM 95.5 FM is commercial broadcast station in Marysville, Kansas that plays country music as well as local news, weather, and sports coverage. The station signed on the air July 23, 1974 and moved into a new broadcast studio with sister-station KNDY 1570 AM in July 2006.

Newscasts
Monday-Friday
KNDY Morning News (7:00-8:00AM)
KNDY Midday News (12:00-1:00PM)
KNDY Evening News (5:00-6:00PM)

Sports Programming
KNDY FM 95.5 is an affiliate of the Kansas Jayhawks radio network. The station features play by play of KU football and men's basketball. During the fall and winter seasons the station features live play by play of Marshall and Washington county high school football and boys and girls basketball games. Starting in 2011 Marysville High School football and boys and girls basketball will move to KNDY AM 1570/FM 94.1.

External links

NDY-FM